Jawahar Navodaya Vidyalaya, Mothuka, Faridabad is located in Ballabgarh tehsil, Faridabad district of Haryana, India. It is a part of the Jawahar Navodaya Vidyalaya system of alternate schools for gifted students in India.

Geography 

Management
This school is managed by Navodaya Vidyalaya Samiti which is an autonomous organization of the Ministry of Human Resource Development. Main affairs of the school are looked after by NVS regional office Chandigarh. On state level Deputy commissioner of the concerned district is the Chairman of the Vidyalaya level Committees with local educationists, public representatives and officials from the District as members.

Admission procedure 
Talented students from each district are selected through an All India Level Entrance Exam conducted each year by CBSE and are given admission to the 6th standard/class in the JNVs of respective districts. Till 1998, the Jawahar Navodaya Vidyalaya Selection Test (JNVST) was conducted by the National Council of Educational Research and Training, however it is conducted by the Central Board of Secondary Education ever since. The test is largely non-verbal and objective in nature and is designed to prevent any disadvantage to children from rural areas. Now admissions are also taken in Class IX and XI. During academic year 2008-09 admissions will be allowed in Class VIII. These admissions are conducted through an objective and descriptive test containing questions on English, Mathematics, Science, & Social Sciences. This "Lateral Entry" system is devised to fill the vacancies that arise due to withdrawal of admissions of the children who are admitted in class VI.

Affiliations
JNV Mothuka is affiliated with Central Board for Secondary Education C.B.S.E. The school follows syllabus prescribed by CBSE.

See also
 Jawahar Navodaya Vidyalaya

References

Jawahar Navodaya Vidyalayas in Haryana
Schools in Faridabad
Educational institutions established in 1986
1986 establishments in Haryana